April 13 - Eastern Orthodox liturgical calendar - April 15

All fixed commemorations below are observed on April 27 by Eastern Orthodox Churches on the Old Calendar.

For April 14th, Orthodox Churches on the Old Calendar commemorate the Saints listed on April 1.

Saints

 Apostles Aristarchus of Apamea, Pudens, and Trophimus of the Seventy Apostles (c. 67)  (see also: April 15 - Slavic)
 Martyr Ardalion the Actor, who suffered under Maximian (c. 305-311)
 Martyr Azat the Eunuch and 1,000 Martyrs of Persia under Shapur II (341)
 Martyr Thomais of Alexandria (476)  (see also April 13 - Slavic)
 Saint  St Martin the Confessor, Pope of Rome (655)  (see also April 13 - Greek, and West)
 St. Sergiy, Pir and Theodor, Confessor Bishops who were exiled to the Crimean peninsula together with St. Martin the Confessor, Pope of Rome (c. 655)  (see also: Two Confessor Bishops - April 13, Greek)
 Venerable martyr Christopher the Sabbaite, of St. Sabbas’ Monastery (797)  (see also April 13 - Greek)

Pre-Schism Western saints

 Virgin-martyr Domnina of Terni and Companions, martyred in Terni in Italy at the same time as Bishop Valentine (c. 269)
 Martyrs Tiburtius, Valerian and Maximus, in Rome (3rd century)
 Saint Tassach, one of St Patrick's earliest disciples and first Bishop of Raholp, Ireland (c. 495)
 Saint Abundius the Sacristan, a sacrist at St Peter's in Rome (c. 564)
 Saint Lambert of Lyons, Abbot of Fontenelle and Bishop of Lyons (688)

Post-Schism Orthodox saints

 Martyrs Anthony, John, and Eustathios, of Vilnius, Lithuania (1347)
 New Martyr Demetrius of the Peloponnese, at Tripolis (1803)

New martyrs and confessors

 New Martyr Sergius (Trofimov) of Nizhni-Novgorod and companion (1918)
 New Hieromartyr Alexander Orlov, Confessor, Priest (1941)

Other commemorations

 Synaxis of the Icon of the Mother of God of Vilnius (1465)

Icon gallery

Notes

References

Sources
 April 14 / April 27. Orthodox Calendar (pravoslavie.ru).
 April 27 / April 14. Holy Trinity Russian Orthodox Church (A parish of the Patriarchate of Moscow).
 April 14. OCA - The Lives of the Saints.
 The Autonomous Orthodox Metropolia of Western Europe and the Americas. St. Hilarion Calendar of Saints for the year of our Lord 2004. St. Hilarion Press (Austin, TX). p. 28.
 April 14. Latin Saints of the Orthodox Patriarchate of Rome.
 The Roman Martyrology. Transl. by the Archbishop of Baltimore. Last Edition, According to the Copy Printed at Rome in 1914. Revised Edition, with the Imprimatur of His Eminence Cardinal Gibbons. Baltimore: John Murphy Company, 1916. p. 105.
Greek Sources
 Great Synaxaristes:  14 Απριλιου. Μεγασ Συναξαριστησ.
  Συναξαριστής. 14 Απριλίου. ecclesia.gr. (H Εκκλησια Τησ Ελλαδοσ). 
Russian Sources
  27 апреля (14 апреля). Православная Энциклопедия под редакцией Патриарха Московского и всея Руси Кирилла (электронная версия). (Orthodox Encyclopedia - Pravenc.ru).
  14 апреля (ст.ст.) 27 апреля 2013 (нов. ст.). Русская Православная Церковь Отдел внешних церковных связей.

April in the Eastern Orthodox calendar